This page is an overview of the results of New Zealand at the World Single Distance Championships.

List of medalists

Medal table

Medals by discipline

Medals by championship

Speed skating in New Zealand